Sant'Apollinare (locally Santapunaro or Santapunare) is a comune (municipality) in the Province of Frosinone in the Italian region Lazio, located about  southeast of Rome and about  southeast of Frosinone.

Sant'Apollinare borders the following municipalities: Cassino, Pignataro Interamna, Rocca d'Evandro, San Giorgio a Liri, Sant'Ambrogio sul Garigliano, Sant'Andrea del Garigliano, Vallemaio.

The town originated in 797, when Gisulf, abbot of Montecassino, created here a small monastic community. In the Middle Ages it had a castle commanding the Liri-Garigliano valley, now in ruins. It became part of the Lazio region in 1927. Due to its position across the Gustav Line, during World War II it suffered relevant destructions.

References

External links
 Official website
  Sant'Apollinare's cemetery

Cities and towns in Lazio
790s establishments
8th-century establishments in Italy